Hafiz or Hafuz Pasha (/Hafuz-paša or Hafus-paša; fl. 1826 - 1904) was an Albanian Ottoman official and vali (governor) of Üsküb (Skopje). In the 1870s, he had the rank of brigadier-general. Under his command, Ottoman troops and bashibazouks suppressed the April Uprising in 1876, and the Kumanovo Uprising in 1878.

Military career
He led a brigade that suppressed the April Uprising. Under his command, 212 of 223 houses in Rakovitsa were burnt down, with 36 inhabitants killed; 26 of 125 houses in Popintsa were burnt down, with 66 inhabitants killed; 60 of 100 houses in Bania were burnt down, with 13 inhabitants killed; 80 of 120 houses, a church and the school in Metchka were burnt down.

On May 20, 1878, he led the brigade that suppressed the four-month-long Kumanovo Uprising.

See also
Yusuf Aga of Sofya
Ahmed Aga Barutanli
Hasan Pasha of Niş
Reshid Pasha

References

Governors of the Ottoman Empire
Ottoman generals
19th-century Ottoman military personnel
Ottoman Serbia
Ottoman period in the history of Kosovo
Ottoman period in the history of North Macedonia
Ottoman period in the history of Bulgaria
Brigadier generals